Golabad (also Romanized as Golābād; also known as Kalābād) is a village in Hayaquq-e Nabi Rural District, in the Central District of Tuyserkan County, Hamadan Province, Iran. At the 2006 census, its population was 314, in 114 families.

References 

Populated places in Tuyserkan County